Fernando González was the defending champion, but did not participate this year.

Novak Djokovic won the tournament (his first career title), beating Nicolás Massú in the final, 7–6(7–5), 6–4.

Seeds

Draw

Finals

Top half

Bottom half

References

External links
 Main draw
 Qualifying draw

Dutch Open (tennis)
2006 ATP Tour
2006 Dutch Open (tennis)